The Women's Championship (formerly The FA Women's Championship) is the second-highest division of women's football in England. The division was established in 2014 as the FA Women's Super League 2 (WSL 2).

WSL 2 replaced the previous level 2 division, the FA Women's Premier League (WPL) National Division, which ended after the 2012–13 season. The WPL's last national division champions, Sunderland A.F.C. Women, were not promoted and also became the first winners of WSL 2 in the 2014 season. In addition to Sunderland, other WPL clubs that joined WSL 2 in 2014 were Watford and Aston Villa.

From 2014 to 2016, WSL 2 ran a summer-based season calendar before reverting to the winter season in 2017–18, the same as WSL 1.

FA WSL 2 was renamed the Women's Championship prior to the 2018–19 season. In 2022 the league was again renamed to its current one.

History

For the 2014 season, the FA Women's Super League was expanded to create a second division with nine new teams added and one team being relegated from the WSL 1. WSL 1 remained as eight teams, with one new team inserted, with the WSL 2 having ten teams.

The new WSL 1 licence was awarded to Manchester City in 2014. Doncaster Rovers Belles were relegated to WSL 2, with nine new licences awarded to London Bees, Durham, Aston Villa, Millwall Lionesses, Yeovil Town, Reading, Sunderland, Watford, and Oxford United. Doncaster Belles appealed against their demotion, but were unsuccessful.

In December 2014, the FA WSL announced a two-year plan to expand WSL 1 from an eight to ten-team league. Two teams would be promoted from WSL 2, while one team would be relegated to WSL 2. Also, for the first time, a team would earn promotion to WSL 2 from the Women's Premier League (now National League), effectively connecting the WSL to the rest of the English women's football pyramid.

This left WSL 1 with nine teams and WSL 2 with ten teams for the 2016 season, and with the process repeated the following year, both WSL 1 and WSL 2 consisted of ten teams each for the 2017–18 season. In addition to being able to prove their financial solvency, clubs applying for entry to the WSL had to show they would attract an average of 350 spectators in 2016, increasing to at least 400 in 2017.

FA WSL 2 was renamed the Women's Championship prior to the 2018–19 season.

In May 2020 the Championship season was halted due to the covid-19 pandemic. In 2022 the league was renamed to simply the Women's Championship, with the FA part being dropped.

Clubs
The following twelve clubs are competing in the 2022–23 season.

Winners
Unless noted, only teams in first were promoted to the FA WSL.

Notes
p.Second place team was also promoted
r.Withdrew from league and relegated

Attendances
In the 2014 season there were 251 fans at a WSL 2 match on average. In 2015 it increased to 341 with thirteen matches reaching attendances of more than 500 spectators.

Notes

References

External links
Official website

 
Eng
Sports leagues established in 2014
2
2
2014 establishments in England